

523001–523100 

|-bgcolor=#f2f2f2
| colspan=4 align=center | 
|}

523101–523200 

|-bgcolor=#f2f2f2
| colspan=4 align=center | 
|}

523201–523300 

|-bgcolor=#f2f2f2
| colspan=4 align=center | 
|}

523301–523400 

|-bgcolor=#f2f2f2
| colspan=4 align=center | 
|}

523401–523500 

|-bgcolor=#f2f2f2
| colspan=4 align=center | 
|}

523501–523600 

|-bgcolor=#f2f2f2
| colspan=4 align=center | 
|}

523601–523700 

|-bgcolor=#f2f2f2
| colspan=4 align=center | 
|}

523701–523800 

|-bgcolor=#f2f2f2
| colspan=4 align=center | 
|}

523801–523900 

|-bgcolor=#f2f2f2
| colspan=4 align=center | 
|}

523901–524000 

|-id=954
| 523954 Guman ||  ||  (1919–2019) was a Hungarian astronomer who studied variable stars using photographic measurements at the Konkoly Observatory and solar astronomy in the Debrecen Heliophysical Observatory. He was an active science communicator and contributor to the Hungarian Astronomical Almanac for many decades. || 
|}

References 

523001-524000